Charles Ambroise de Caffarelli du Falga (1758–1826), baron Caffarelli, was canon of Toul before the French Revolution and one of the Caffarelli brothers.  He became prefect under the First French Empire, then a member of the general counsel of Haute-Garonne.  He was notably Prefect of the Ardèche, Calvados and Aube.

On February 24, 1814, Napoléon issued an imperial order discharging him of his post as Prefect of l'Aube.

The quai Caffarelli and cours Caffarelli in Caen are named after him.

He wrote an "Abrégé des Géoponiques" (summary of the Geoponica attributed to Cassianus Bassus), Paris, 1812.

Sources
Dictionnaire Bouillet

References

1758 births
1826 deaths
People from Haute-Garonne
French people of Italian descent
18th-century French Roman Catholic priests
Barons of the First French Empire
Prefects of France
Prefects of Ardèche
Prefects of Calvados (department)
Prefects of Aube